is a Japanese football player. He plays for Montedio Yamagata in the J2 League.

Club statistics
Updated to 26 July 2022.

References

External links

Profile at Montedio Yamagata

1990 births
Living people
Toyo University alumni
Association football people from Saitama Prefecture
Japanese footballers
J2 League players
J3 League players
Hokkaido Consadole Sapporo players
FC Machida Zelvia players
Montedio Yamagata players
Association football defenders